Rebecca Renee Black (born June 21, 1997) is an American singer and YouTuber. She gained extensive media coverage when the music video for her 2011 single "Friday" went viral on YouTube and other social media sites. "Friday" was derided by many music critics and viewers, who dubbed it "the worst song ever". Black went on to release other songs including her Dave Days collaboration "Saturday". She uploads videos on her YouTube channel about various topics. She has released two independent extended plays, RE / BL (2017) and Rebecca Black Was Here (2021).  Her debut studio album Let Her Burn was released on February 9, 2023.

Early life
Black was born on June 21, 1997 in Irvine, California. She is the daughter of John Jeffery Black and Georgina Marquez Kelly, both veterinarians. Her mother is a Mexican emigrant, and her father, originally from Iowa, is of English, Italian, and Polish descent. Black attended private school from kindergarten to 6th grade, and moved to a public school due to bullying. She joined the school's musical theater program, where she felt she was "meant to be". In April 2011, Black dropped out in favor of homeschooling, citing both a need to focus on her career and a desire to avoid taunts from her former classmates. Black has said that she was also failing English class due to her busy schedule.

Career

2010–2011: "Friday"

In late 2010, a classmate of Black and music video client of Los Angeles record label ARK Music Factory told her about the company. Black's mother paid US$4,000 for ARK Music to produce the music video while the Blacks retained ownership of both the master and the video. The single, "Friday", written entirely by ARK, was released on YouTube and iTunes. The song's video was uploaded to YouTube on February 10, 2011, and received approximately 1,000 views in the first month. The video went viral on March 11, acquiring millions of views on YouTube in a matter of days, becoming the most discussed topic on social networking site Twitter, and garnering mostly negative media coverage. The single was released on March 14, with first-week sales estimated to be around 40,000 by Billboard. On March 22, Black appeared on The Tonight Show with Jay Leno, during which she performed the song and discussed the negative reaction to it. The song peaked on the Billboard Hot 100 and the New Zealand Singles Chart at numbers 58 and 33, respectively. In the UK, the song debuted at number 61 on the UK Singles Chart. In response to the YouTube video of "Friday", Black began to receive phone and email death threats, which were investigated by the Anaheim Police Department. Black teamed up with Funny or Die on April Fools' Day 2011 (when the comedy site was renamed Friday or Die) for a series of videos, including one about the underage teens driving a car in her "Friday" video. She signed to manager Debra Baum's DB Entertainment, reportedly with Ryan Seacrest's help.

Black stated that she is a fan of Justin Bieber, and expressed interest in performing a duet with him. MTV selected Black to host its first online awards show, the O Music Awards Fan Army Party, in April 2011. As an homage to "Friday", Black appeared in the music video for Katy Perry's "Last Friday Night (T.G.I.F.)", in which Black plays alongside Perry as the hostess of a party Perry attends. A cover version of "Friday" was performed on Glee in the second-season episode, "Prom Queen". When asked about why the song was covered on Glee, show creator Ryan Murphy replied, "The show pays tribute to pop culture and, love it or hate it, that song is pop culture." Not long after the "Friday" video went viral on YouTube, Black and her mother, Georgina Kelly, got into legal issues with ARK Music over rights to the song. In a letter from Kelly's lawyer to ARK Music on March 29, 2011, it was alleged that ARK Music failed to fulfill the terms of their November 2010 agreement by not giving her the song and video's master recordings, by claiming Black as exclusively signed to the label, and by exploiting the song without permission – for example, selling a "Friday" ringtone. While Ark founder (and "Friday" co-writer) Patrice Wilson stated that Kelly "will get the masters and the song [...] [t]hey can have it all", and agreed that Black was not exclusive to Ark, his attorney claimed that Ark owns the copyright for the song and the November agreement is invalid. In June 2011, ARK Music Factory started charging  to watch the music video on YouTube. Later that month, "Friday" was removed as a result of the legal dispute; it was restored to YouTube on September 16, 2011, on Black's official channel. "Friday" was revealed as YouTube's No. 1 video of 2011, with Black hosting a short video called YouTube Rewind in the year-end recap. The video received more than 167 million views and more than 3,190,000 "dislikes" during its first four months, prior to its temporary removal. After the fallout with ARK Music Factory, Black started an independent record label named RB Records.

2011–2013: Early songs and covers
Black released a self-produced single titled "My Moment" on July 18, 2011, the first on her label, with an accompanying music video published to her YouTube channel the same day. In the video, director Morgan Lawley features real life footage of Black from both before and after the popularization of "Friday". In late October 2011, production began on the music video for Black's third single, "Person of Interest". About the song, Black stated  "The basis of it is that it's a love song but it's not a love song. It's about almost teenage crushes – when you're not in love yet but you really like a guy – which I'm really excited about because I don't think there are too many out like that. It's very much a dance type song. It will make you get up and dance and sing along in your car." The single and its accompanying music video were released on November 15, 2011. Black released two more singles in 2012: "Sing It" in May, and "In Your Words" in November. Black was planning to release her debut studio album in late 2011, which she said would include "a bunch of different kinds of stuff." The album was being recorded at a studio belonging to music producer Charlton Pettus. However, the album was never released. Black was featured in an ABC Primetime Nightline: Celebrity Secrets special entitled Underage and Famous: Inside Child Stars' Lives.

In 2012, Black signed onto the Maker Studios YouTube network. She was also brought to Australia by Telstra to promote the launch of their 4G service. Zeitgeist, which sorted billions of Google searches to capture the year's 10 fastest-rising global queries, listed Black as "#1 Most Searched – Google". The searches for the teen singer topped even those of pop icons Lady Gaga and Adele. In late 2013, Black released the song "Saturday". For her sequel to "Friday", she collaborated with Dave Days. It became Black's second song to chart on the Billboard Hot 100, peaking at number 55. While it reached a higher position than "Friday" (number 58), "Saturday" was on the chart only one week, compared to six for "Friday". Aside from her original music, Black has been posting videos regularly on her YouTube channel, which include blogs (sometimes with other people on YouTube), question-and-answer videos, and occasional covers of songs by other artists. This includes her versions of two Miley Cyrus songs from 2013. That July, Black collaborated with fellow YouTube personality Jon D in an acoustic cover of "We Can't Stop", for which lyrical changes were made. Black followed with an acoustic version of "Wrecking Ball" in November.

At VidCon 2015, Black revealed that she had been working on a studio album which she hoped to release by the end of 2015. According to her, the album would not be anything like her previous songs. She had been working on the album since releasing her song "Friday"; however, but it took her a while to be free from ARK Music Factory and find producers with whom she was comfortable. However, no album or new original songs were released. Towards the end of 2015, Black performed a cover of "Wild" by Troye Sivan. Black created a web video in January 2016 on go90 called "Life After Friday". In the show, Black graduates from high school, tells her parents she is not going to college and follows her adventures after moving to Los Angeles.

2016–2020: RE / BL
On August 26, 2016, Black released a new single titled "The Great Divide", her first release of new material in almost three years. This single was the last of her songs to make the charts, which was achieved at No. 23 under the "US Dance" category. Black came out with two more singles in the following year, which included "Foolish" on April 21, 2017, and "Heart Full of Scars" on September 1, 2017. She then released an EP on September 15, 2017, titled RE / BL, which included these two songs as well as "The Great Divide". In June 2018, she appeared on BBC Radio 5 talking about cyberbullying, the adverse effects online attacks had on her and how cruel comments "stick with you forever". Black released the final single from RE / BL, titled "Satellite", on June 4, 2018.

On June 7, 2018, Black appeared as a contestant in season 2 of the reality television musical competition series The Four: Battle for Stardom, broadcast on Fox. The series is hosted by Fergie and judged by Sean Combs, Meghan Trainor and DJ Khaled. Black sang "Bye Bye Bye" by NSYNC for her audition, and received the go-ahead for the next round with "three blue rings" from all three judges. In the next round, she picked contestant James Graham from the boy band Stereo Kicks as her opponent. Graham performed "A Song for You", followed by Black singing Ednaswap's "Torn". The audience voted on the two performances, preferring to save Graham, with Black being eliminated from the show. After her appearance, she tweeted: "I am just blown away reading your comments and seeing so much support online,” she wrote. “Sending all of my love right back to you. Thank you for hearing me, for seeing me. This is just the beginning. Also I don't think I'm gonna sleep at all tonight I'm way too excited."

On National French Fry Day 2018, YouTube personality Miranda Sings, in collaboration with Dunkin' Donuts, released an adapted version of "Friday" titled "Donut Fry Day featuring Rebecca Black", as part of the Donut Fries marketing strategy. Black continued to release singles throughout 2019 and 2020 with the singles "Anyway", "Do You?", "Sweetheart" and "Self Sabotage". In September 2020, Black featured on the Dorian Electra track "Edgelord".

2021–present: Rebecca Black Was Here and Let Her Burn

On January 29, 2021, Black released the song "Girlfriend". Shortly after, on February 10, 2021, she released a hyperpop remix of "Friday" produced by Dylan Brady of 100 Gecs and featuring 3OH!3, Big Freedia and Dorian Electra to commemorate the song's tenth anniversary. After releasing the singles "Personal" and "Worth It for the Feeling", Black announced her second EP, Rebecca Black Was Here, which was released on June 16, 2021.

On November 10, 2022, Black announced her debut studio album, Let Her Burn, for release in early 2023. Four days later, she released the first single from the album, "Crumbs" accompanied by a music video. Critics praised the song, with BrooklynVegan calling it a "hypnotic electropop track". The second single, "Look at You", was released on December 7 and was also well received. On January 6, 2023, Black announced that the album was scheduled for release in the following month, on February 9, 2023. Shortly after, the third and final single, "Sick to My Stomach", was debuted on January 18, 2023. BroadwayWorld noted that the diversity between the singles "showcase[d] Rebecca Black's versatility as an artist and of the project". Let Her Burn was released on February 9, 2023, and was thereafter described as "getting solid marks from critics and fans alike".

Personal life 
On April 3, 2020, Black came out as queer during an episode of the Dating Straight podcast.

Discography

Studio albums

Extended plays

Selected singles

Music videos

Filmography

Awards and nominations

References

External links

 
 
 
 
 

1997 births
Living people
21st-century American women singers
21st-century American singers
American child singers
American dance musicians
American women pop singers
American musicians of Mexican descent
American people of English descent
American people of Italian descent
American people of Polish descent
American YouTubers
Hispanic and Latino American musicians
ARK Music Factory
Child pop musicians
Musicians from Orange County, California
People from Irvine, California
RPM people
Singers from California
Victims of cyberbullying
YouTube channels launched in 2005
American LGBT musicians
American LGBT singers
LGBT people from California
LGBT YouTubers
Queer musicians
Queer women
20th-century American LGBT people
21st-century American LGBT people